Matthew Karwalski (born 3 February 1985 in Wagga Wagga) is a professional squash player who represented Australia. He reached a career-high world ranking of World No. 49 in December 2013. He participated in the WSF Men's World Team Championship 2013 in Mulhouse, France  and also represented Australia in the Glasgow 2014 Commonwealth Games.

References

External links 
 
 
 

Australian male squash players
Living people
1985 births
Commonwealth Games competitors for Australia
Squash players at the 2014 Commonwealth Games
20th-century Australian people
21st-century Australian people